The 2016–17 Duleep Trophy was the 55th season of the Duleep Trophy, a first-class cricket tournament in India. In June 2016, the Board of Control for Cricket in India (BCCI) announced that the tournament will feature day/night matches and pink ball will be used. The tournament was contested by three teams.

In August 2016 the BCCI confirmed that three teams, India Red, India Blue and India Green would play in a round-robin league stage. Each of these matches will last for four days, with the final scheduled to last five days, starting on 10 September. India Blue won the trophy, beating India Red by 355 runs in the final.

Squads

Fixtures

Round-robin

Final

References

External links
 Series home at ESPN Cricinfo

Duleep Trophy seasons
Duleep Trophy
Duleep Trophy